Alberto Righini was an Italian bobsledder who competed in the late 1950s. He won two medals in the four-man event at the FIBT World Championships with a silver in 1959 and a bronze in 1958.

References
Bobsleigh four-man world championship medalists since 1930

Italian male bobsledders
Possibly living people
Year of birth missing